The following is a list of the heads of state of modern Vietnam since 1945, from the establishment of the Empire of Vietnam to the present day.

Empire of Vietnam (1945)

North Vietnam

Democratic Republic of Vietnam (1945–76)

Status

South Vietnam

State of Vietnam (1949–55)

Status

Republic of Vietnam (1955–75)

Status

Republic of South Vietnam (1969–76)

Reunified Vietnam

Socialist Republic of Vietnam (1976–present)

Status

Timeline

See also
History of Vietnam since 1945
List of monarchs of Vietnam
President of Vietnam
List of presidents of Vietnam
List of spouses of Vietnamese presidents
Leaders of South Vietnam

Notes

External links
List of Vietnamese heads of state and government
World Statesmen – Vietnam

Vietnam

Heads of state
Heads of state